Dar Hassan Pacha is an 18th-century palace located in the Casbah of Algiers, Algeria. It was built in 1791 and used to belong to Hassan III Pasha, who signed a treaty with the US September 5, 1795. After 1830, it became the winter residence of the Governor of Algiers, and as a consequence, it was completely remodelled in 1839, when the entrance has been changed and a new façade was created.

See also
 Casbah of Algiers
 Palace of the Dey
 People's Palace (Algiers)

References

External links

Casbah of Algiers
Palaces in Algeria